Amer Mubarak (born 28 December 1987 in United Arab Emirates) is an Emirati footballer who plays for Khor Fakkan as a midfielder. He was called to United Arab Emirates national football team at 2011 AFC Asian Cup and 2014 FIFA World Cup qualification.

References

External links

1987 births
Emirati footballers
2011 AFC Asian Cup players
Living people
Al-Nasr SC (Dubai) players
Al Ahli Club (Dubai) players
Baniyas Club players
Khor Fakkan Sports Club players
UAE Pro League players
Footballers at the 2006 Asian Games
Association football midfielders
Asian Games competitors for the United Arab Emirates
United Arab Emirates international footballers
2007 AFC Asian Cup players